At the Mountains of Madness is a 2005 double live album by American composer and saxophonist John Zorn's Electric Masada featuring performances recorded in Moscow and Ljubljana.  It is the second release by Electric Masada.

Reception
The Allmusic review by Sean Westergaard awarded the album 4 stars noting that "the band is at the top of their game after all the touring, and everyone seems to have kicked up the energy a notch or two. There's a lot more conducted improvisation than on the previous Electric Masada release... Thanks to their improvisational skills, you hardly notice that the program is much the same on both discs. Score another one for John Zorn and company. At the Mountains of Madness is a winner."

Track listing
Disc one
 "Lilin" – 16:14
 "Metal Tov" – 5:35
 "Karaim" – 16:15
 "Hath-Arob" – 5:17
 "Abidan" – 8:09
 "Idalah-Abal" – 6:33
 "Kedem" – 15:41
 "Yatzar" – 6:05
Disc two
 "Tekufah" – 17:59
 "Hath-Arob" – 6:55
 "Abidan" – 9:59
 "Metal Tov" – 5:52
 "Karaim" – 15:15
 "Idalah-Abal" – 6:08
 "Kedem" – 14:47
All compositions by John Zorn.

Disc 1 recorded by Daniel Goldaracena in Moscow, 2004. Disc 2 recorded by Daniel Goldaracena in Ljubljana, 2004.

Personnel
John Zorn – alto saxophone
Marc Ribot – guitar
Jamie Saft – keyboards
Ikue Mori – electronics
Trevor Dunn – bass
Joey Baron – drums
Kenny Wollesen – drums
Cyro Baptista – percussion

References

Masada (band) albums
Albums produced by John Zorn
John Zorn live albums
2005 live albums
Tzadik Records live albums
Albums recorded in Slovenia